The Australian Darts Open is a darts tournament held at Moama Bowling Club in Moama, Australia. First edition of the tournament took place in 2019. The next edition of this tournament took place in 2022 after an interruption caused by COVID-19 pandemic. World Darts Federation announced that the Australian Darts Open has been awarded Platinum ranking status, with a total prize fund of A$80,000, set to be one of the biggest WDF events in 2022.

Tournament has been open to players worldwide, with open qualifiers for this staged event across Australia. The stage format adopted for this tournament had been used before at the Finder Darts Masters. First winners of the tournament was Damon Heta and Lisa Ashton.

Results

Men's

Women's

References

Sports competitions in Australia
Darts tournaments
Recurring sporting events established in 2019
Darts in Australia